The Plunger is a 1920 American silent drama film directed by Dell Henderson and starring George Walsh,  Virginia Valli and  Richard Neill.

Cast
 George Walsh as 'Take a Chance' Schuyler
 Virginia Valli as 	Alice Houghton
 Byron Douglas as John Houghton
 Richard Neill as 	Norman Yates 
 Edward Boulden as Jimmie Mullin 
 Inez Shannon as 	Mrs. Mullin
 Irving Brooks as Beggs
 Robert Vivian as 	Dobbins
 W.S. Harkins as 	Richard Dodge

References

Bibliography
 Connelly, Robert B. The Silents: Silent Feature Films, 1910-36, Volume 40, Issue 2. December Press, 1998.
 Munden, Kenneth White. The American Film Institute Catalog of Motion Pictures Produced in the United States, Part 1. University of California Press, 1997.
 Solomon, Aubrey. The Fox Film Corporation, 1915-1935: A History and Filmography. McFarland, 2011.

External links
 

1920 films
1920 drama films
1920s English-language films
American silent feature films
Silent American drama films
American black-and-white films
Films directed by Dell Henderson
Fox Film films
1920s American films
English-language drama films